Hungarian may refer to:

 Hungary, a country in Central Europe
 Kingdom of Hungary, state of Hungary, existing between 1000 and 1946
 Hungarians, ethnic groups in Hungary
 Hungarian algorithm, a polynomial time algorithm for solving the assignment problem
 Hungarian language, a Finno-Ugric language spoken in Hungary and all neighbouring countries
 Hungarian notation, a naming convention in computer programming
 Hungarian cuisine, the cuisine of Hungary and the Hungarians

See also
 
 

Language and nationality disambiguation pages